Robert W. Thurston (born 1949) is an American historian and author.  He is professor emeritus at Miami University (Ohio) and founder and managing partner of Oxford Coffee Company, a roastery and coffeehouse. His most recent publications have been on coffee (Coffee:  From Bean to Barista, Coffee: A Comprehensive Guide to the Bean, the Beverage, and the Industry). Perhaps primarily known for his work on the history of Russia and the Soviet Union, Thurston has also written on early modern witch hunts (The Witch Hunts in Europe and North America: A History of the Witch Persecutions in Europe and North America, a revised edition of Witch, Wicce, Mother Goose: The Rise and Fall of the Witch Hunts in Europe and North America). He is also co-founder and managing partner of the Oxford Coffee Company, a roastery and coffeehouse in Oxford, Ohio.

He has given talks in recent years in the U.S., Britain, France, Nicaragua, and China on coffee and consumption patterns.  He has been interviewed regularly on coffee, for example for BBC 4, the Food Network, and Dr. Oz The Good Life.  His trips to coffee "origin," the industry term for coffee farms, have taken him to ten countries.  He has been interviewed several times on WVXU, Cincinnati's NPR station, on several topics ranging from populism to coffee to the history of land preservation in the U.S. Podcasts with him are discussions of lynching and the witch hunts and film.

He has written occasionally on current issues in Ukraine and on how people get their history from romance novels.

His latest book, forthcoming from Routledge in early 2022, is The Body in the Anglo-Saxon World, 1880-1920: "Well Sexed Womanhood," "Finer Natives," and "Very White Men."  The book examines concepts of gender, sexuality, race, and civilization as they were affected  by new ideas, close interaction between races, and new technology like photography. presentations of the body changed and spread throughout the English speaking lands and colonies in photos, on the safety bicycles,  in new or revamped sports, and in the circus. 

His current writing project is "Eight Weeks that Established Federal Power: War, Rebellion,  and Guns in 1794.

His blog is Not Your Party Line Historian.

Biography
Born in Washington, D.C., Thurston graduated from high school outside of Cleveland and received his undergraduate education at Northwestern University, studying Russian to complement his history degree. He went on to earn a doctorate in modern Russian history from the University of Michigan. He spent two separate years doing research in the Soviet Union/Russia and eventually moved to Oxford, Ohio, where he taught history at Miami University for 25 years until his retirement in 2015.

In 2012, Thurston cofounded the Oxford Coffee Company in Oxford, Ohio.

Bibliography 
 The Body in the Anglosphere, 1880-1920: "Well Sexed Womanhood," Finer Natives," and " Very White Men." Forthcoming in 2022 from Routledge.
 Coffee: From Bean to Barista, Rowman and Littlefield, 2018.
 Coffee:  A Comprehensive Guide to the Bean, the Beverage, and the Industry, senior editor and contributor, Rowman and Littlefield, 2013.  The book won a prize from Gourmand Magazine as the best published on coffee in the U.S. in 2013. Named by Library Journal as one of the best reference works of 2013.
 Lynching: American Mob Murder in Global Perspective Ashgate, 2011.
 The Witch Hunts: A History of the Witch Persecutions in Europe and North America Longman, 2006.  A revised version of Witch, Wicce, Mother Goose: The Rise and Fall of the Witch Hunts in Europe and North America Longman, 2001.
 The People's War: Responses to World War II in the Soviet Union, Co-editor with Bernd Bonwetsch, contributor, University of Illinois Press, 2000; anthology.
 Life and Terror in Stalin's Russia, 1934-1941 (1996). Yale University Press.
 Liberal City, Conservative State: Moscow and Russia's Urban Crisis, 1906-1914'' Oxford University Press, 1987.
 Articles and op-eds in various newspapers and popular magazines, e.g. History Today.  Articles on coffee in several trade magazines.

References

External links

Robert W. Thurston at Oxford Coffee Company

Living people
1949 births

Miami University faculty
21st-century American historians
21st-century American male writers
Stalinism-era scholars and writers
American historians
American male non-fiction writers
Northwestern University alumni
 American expatriates in the Soviet Union